St Peter's Church is a 19th-century church of the Estonian Evangelical Lutheran Church located in Tartu, Estonia.

St Peter's Parish
The parish separated from St Mary's parish on 27 October 1869. The congregation used St. John's Church, Tartu until the new church was built.

Church building
The cornerstone of St Peter's Church was laid on 31 May 1883. The Neo-Gothic church was built between 1883 and 1884 on a design by architect Viktor Schröter. It was consecrated on 16 September 1884, and finally completed in 1903, when the church's western tower was completed, a design by Georg Hellat. The cost of building the church was 110,000 rubles, and most of the money was raised through donations.

Interior
The interior of the church is also predominantly Neo-Gothic. The interior features a remarkable altarpiece dating from 1900, the work of Gustav Beermann; an altar painting titled "The Calling Christ" dating from 1897, the work of Johann Köler; and an organ with 22 pipes which was made in 1891 by Wilhelm Müllverstedt.

Soviet times
In 1948, after St Mary's parish lost their church property, St Peter's was also used by St Mary's congregation as their parish church, which remained in place until 1997. Church membership also declined drastically by the 1980s due to the Soviet state's repression of Christianity, from 22,378 in 1912 to 483 in 1985. Membership started to increase again during the late 1980 and early 1990s, in the last few years of the Soviet Union, however.

References

Gallery 

Gothic Revival church buildings in Estonia
Religious organizations established in 1869
Churches completed in 1884
Lutheran churches in Estonia
Churches in Tartu